Silverspring is a residential neighbourhood located in northeast Saskatoon, Saskatchewan, Canada. It is a suburban subdivision, composed mostly of low-density, single detached houses. As of 2007, the area is home to 4,936 residents. The neighbourhood is considered a high income area, with an average family income of $85,084, an average dwelling value of $322,670 and a home ownership rate of 97.8%.
According to MLS data, the average sale price of a home as of 2013 was $407,171.

History
The majority of Silverspring was constructed during the late 1980s and through the 1990s, on land formerly administered by the University of Saskatchewan. The land for the Silverspring community was annexed between 1955, and 1959; however, the majority of residential building construction was done after 1991, and a small amount of construction was just one decade before this.

Notable Saskatoon athletes and contributors to the sports world had roadways of Silverspring named in their honour. They include Diane Jones Konihowski, Hal Laycoe, Catriona Le May Doan and Vera Pezer.

Government and politics

Silverspring exists within the federal electoral district of Saskatoon—University. It is currently represented by Corey Tochor of the Conservative Party of Canada, first elected in 2019.

Provincially, the area is within the constituency of Saskatoon Silverspring-Sutherland. It is currently represented by Paul Merriman of the Saskatchewan Party, first elected in 2011 and re-elected in 2016.

In Saskatoon's non-partisan municipal politics, Silverspring lies within ward 10. It is currently represented by Zach Jeffries, first elected in 2012.

Institutions

Education

École St. Mother Teresa School - separate (Catholic) elementary, part of Greater Saskatoon Catholic Schools
École Silverspring School - public elementary, part of the Saskatoon Public School Division
Adjacent to University of Saskatchewan lands, with some U of S lecture and research facilities located across Central Avenue from Silverspring. The main campus is several kilometres away.
The Regional Psychiatric Centre is located on Central Avenue, between Garvie Road and Somers Road

Parks and recreation
 Christine Morris Park - 
 Dave King Park - 
 Silverspring Park - 

Many types of plants, such as grasses, lichens, wildflowers and fungi can be found in this ecosystem. The Saskatoon Nature Society acts as the steward for this natural area. Sutherland Beach, a popular park and off-leash area along the east shore of the South Saskatchewan River, is accessible via a roadway off Central Avenue immediately adjacent to Silverspring.

Silverspring is also immediately adjacent to the Forestry Farm Park and Zoo.

The Silverspring Community Association is involved in operating the community rink, organizing sports teams, and hosting a variety of events and activities.

Commercial
At present, no parts of Silverspring have commercial development though a couple of lots on Central Avenue have been set aside for neighbourhood commercial. 103 home-based businesses exist in the area. The closest major commercial is the nearby University Heights commercial area accessed via Attridge Drive to the east, and the Preston Crossing big box development to the west.

Location
Silverspring is located within the University Heights Suburban Development Area. It is bounded by Agra Road to the north, Attridge Drive to the south, Central Avenue to the west, and the Saskatoon Forestry Farm Park and Zoo to the east. City maps show Agra Road replaced by a new arterial named Fedoruk Road as the northern boundary.

References

External links

Silverspring neighbourhood profile 2007
Silverspring Community Association

Neighbourhoods in Saskatoon